Sveti Štefan may refer to several places in Slovenia: 

Štefan pri Trebnjem, a settlement in the Municipality of Trebnje, known as Sveti Štefan until 1955
Sveti Štefan, Šmarje pri Jelšah, a settlement in the Municipality of Šmarje pri Jelšah
Turje, Hrastnik, a settlement in the Municipality of Hrastnik, known as Sveti Štefan until 1955